Woundwort is the common name for several species of plants and may refer to:

Family Lamiaceae:
 Numerous plants of the genus Stachys
 Prunella vulgaris, an herbaceous plant in the genus Prunella
Family Asteraceae:
 Achillea millefolium, a flowering plant in the family Asteraceae
 Bellis perennis, a common European species of daisy
 Solidago virgaurea, an herbaceous perennial plant of the family Asteraceae
Family Fabaceae:
 Anthyllis vulneraria, a medicinal plant native to Europe

Other
 Field Woundwort
 Hedge Woundwort
 Marsh Woundwort
 Woundwort Marble

See also
 General Woundwort, a fictional rabbit in Watership Down by Richard Adams